James Fargo (born August 14, 1938) is an American film director. He directed numerous films from 1976 to 1998. After serving as assistant director to Steven Spielberg on Duel and on many films starring Clint Eastwood, he was then given the chance to direct the third Dirty Harry film, The Enforcer, in 1976. Later he also directed Eastwood in 1978's Every Which Way but Loose. It would be his final film working with Eastwood. Fargo has also directed other films such as Caravans, A Game for Vultures, Voyage of the Rock Aliens, as well as Forced Vengeance with Chuck Norris.

Fargo has also directed television shows, such as The A-Team, Hunter, Scarecrow and Mrs. King and Beverly Hills 90210.

Filmography
 The Enforcer (1976)
 Caravans (1978)
 Every Which Way But Loose (1978)
 Game for Vultures (1979)
 Forced Vengeance (1982)
Tales of the Gold Monkey (1983) (TV series)
 Voyage of the Rock Aliens (1984)
The A-Team (1984) (TV series)
Gus Brown and the Midnight Brewster (1985) (TV movie)
Scarecrow and Mrs. King (1985-86) (TV series)
Sidekicks (1986) (TV series)
 Born to Race (1988)
Hunter (1988-89) (TV series)
 Riding the Edge (1989)
Sky High (1990) (TV movie)
Berlin Break (1993) (TV series)
Beverly Hills, 90210 (1995-96) (TV series)
 Second Chances (1998)
Born to Ride (2011)

References

External links 

1938 births
Living people
American television directors
People from Ferry County, Washington
Film directors from Washington (state)